NRK P1 is a nationwide digital radio channel operated by the Norwegian Broadcasting Corporation (NRK). It is the result of the NRK radio channel reform initiated in 1993 by radio director Tor Fuglevik.

NRK P1 is the direct descendant of NRK's first radio station which began broadcasting in 1933. P1's programming is aimed at a broad mature demographic and it is Norway's most popular radio station, with approximately 1.9 million listeners daily.

Broadcasting
P1's headquarters are located in the Tyholt area of Trondheim and most of its programmes are made there, except for news broadcasts which are produced, together with some other programming, at Broadcasting House in Marienlyst, Oslo. 

With its 1,176 FM transmitters using 124 different frequencies, NRK P1 was the largest radio network in Europe. However, all NRK's radio stations were gradually digitised during 2017 and are now transmitted via DAB+ and internet. NRK P1 also formerly transmitted in longwave at 153 kHz via the Ingøy radio transmitter (opened in 2000, closed 2 December 2019 12:06 AM CET), which served the country's fishing fleet in the Barents Sea.

Local programming

The channel's schedules include around 24.5 hours of local programming each week, produced by the following regional centres:

P1 Buskerud
P1 Finnmark
P1 Hordaland
P1 Innlandet
P1 Møre og Romsdal
P1 Nordland
P1 Oslo og Akershus
P1 Rogaland
P1 Sogn og Fjordane
P1 Sørlandet
P1 Telemark
P1 Troms
P1 Trøndelag
P1 Vestfold
P1 Østfold

References

External links

NRK P1 - official home page (in Norwegian)
NRK P1, Local programming (in Norwegian)

NRK
Radio stations in Norway
Radio stations established in 1933
1933 establishments in Norway